Rad Lab can refer to:

The Radiation Laboratory of Ernest O. Lawrence, now known as Lawrence Berkeley National Laboratory
The wartime MIT Radiation Laboratory at the Massachusetts Institute of Technology, which aided in the development of radar
The Readiness, Activation, and Decision-making Laboratory at University of California, San Francisco.
The Research in Adolescent Depression Lab at the University of Minnesota.